Thomas Raybould (July 1884–1944) was an English footballer who played in the Football League for Wolverhampton Wanderers.

References

1884 births
1944 deaths
English footballers
Association football midfielders
English Football League players
Kidderminster Harriers F.C. players
Wolverhampton Wanderers F.C. players
Grimsby Town F.C. players
Worksop Town F.C. players
Stourbridge F.C. players